Balchrick is a  township on the north east shore of Lairg in Sutherland, Scottish Highlands and is in the Scottish council area of Highland.

Balchrick lies entirely within the estate of John Muir Trust's Sandwood Estate.  Balchrick also lies between Blairmore and Sheigra. To the South / South West you find the beaches of Polin and Oldshoremore.

Just a hundred yards away is the start of the trail to Sandwood Bay, one of the most beautiful beaches in North West Scotland. Starting at Blairmore and approximately four miles walk to your destination.

References

Populated places in Sutherland